Bad Day (also known as Badday, Computer rage or Office rage) is a 27-second viral video where a frustrated office worker assaults his cubicle computer. It has circulated virally online since 1997. The video became a cultural embodiment of computer rage, and is the subject of several parodies and ad campaigns.

Plot
In the surveillance-style video, an office worker in his cubicle is becoming increasingly irritated with the computer. He slaps the monitor and pounds on the keyboard with his fist before picking the keyboard up and using it like a baseball bat to knock the monitor off of the desk. His neighbor peers over the partition twice in curiosity. The video ends with the protagonist kicking the monitor out of their cubicle.

Production and spread
The video clip was staged and produced by Durango, Colorado-based Loronix Information Systems to demonstrate the benefits of their digital video surveillance system for release on a promotional CD. The video is an example of a potential use for the surveillance system. The video's subject is Vinny Licciardi, the company's shipping manager. Licciardi appeared in a series of promotional videos extolling the benefits of Loronix's special brand of digital video recording systems. Loronix was the first company to develop a digital video surveillance system to replace video tape recorders. , Loronix is a subsidiary of Verint Systems.

Bad Day has circulated online since at least 1997. It made its largest impression via email, where its reasonable size made distribution easy. The origin was revealed in 1998 originally by CNN and later in print by Security Distribution Magazine. The company first heard of the video's popularity in June 1998. Its popularity within the company created internal computer issues.

Legacy
According to user interaction expert Frank Thissen, though fictional, it provides an example of how user expectations from longstanding social conventions can be frustrated through poor programming. In the Bad Day scenario, "The expectations of the user are obviously badly neglected", and the computer's lack of reaction or poor reaction is understood in the context of a human social situation, such as when someone walks away in the middle of a conversation. Wireds Michelle Delio called the protagonist "the patron saint of computer bashers".

Follow-ups to the video were featured on TechTV promos, where the same man is videotaped throwing the computer down a flight of stairs, and later running it over with his car. A 2005 spoof was produced by GoViral for the network security firm NetOp, showing a computer fighting back.

References

External links
 

1996 films
Human–computer interaction
Viral videos